Unai is a Basque male given name, which means "shepherd". It is one of the most popular first names for boys in the Basque Country. The name may refer to:

Spanish football players
Unai Alba (born 1978) 
Unai Albizua (born 1989) 
Unai Bilbao (born 1994)
Unai Bustinza (born 1992)
Unai Elgezabal (born 1993)
Unai Emery (born 1971)
Unai Expósito (born 1980) 
Unai García (born 1992)
Unai López (born 1995)
Unai Medina (born 1990)
Unai Núñez (born 1997)
Unai Simón (born 1997)
Unai Vencedor (born 2000)
Unai Vergara (born 1977)

Spanish cyclists
Unai Elorriaga (born 1980)
Unai Iparragirre (born 1988) 
Unai Osa (born 1975)
Unai Uribarri (born 1984)
Unai Yus (born 1974)

Other
Unai Etxebarria (born 1972), Venezuelan road racing cyclist

References

Basque masculine given names